Robert Roberts (born 2 September 1940) is a Scottish former football player and manager who played as a midfielder.

Career
He joined Motherwell from the Edinburgh Norton junior club, and went on to make almost 100 league appearances for the Steelmen. He was made player of the year by the supporter's association for 1962. Roberts moved to play in the Football League with Leicester City for the 1963–64 season. He went on to play 230 league matches for the club, and also appeared in the 1969 FA Cup Final and the second leg of the 1965 Football League Cup Final. He subsequently transferred to Mansfield Town.

He moved into coaching with a brief stint as player-coach with Coventry City, and then in June 1975 he was appointed as manager of Colchester United. He remained at the club for seven years, and led them to promotion to the Football League Third Division in the 1976–77 season.

He also managed Wrexham from 1982 to 1985 and Grimsby Town from 1987 to 1988, relinquishing the role to Alan Buckley. Whilst managing Wrexham, he played one game in a Welsh Cup 3rd round tie against Worcester City, playing in goal to cover for injury.

Since then, Roberts has moved into scouting, working for Derby County, Tottenham Hotspur, Newcastle United and Oxford City.

Managerial statistics

Honours

Club
Leicester City
 FA Cup Runner-up (1): 1968–69
 League Cup Runner-up (1): 1964–65

References 

1940 births
Living people
Scottish footballers
English Football League players
Scottish Football League players
Motherwell F.C. players
Leicester City F.C. players
Mansfield Town F.C. players
Coventry City F.C. players
Colchester United F.C. players
Wrexham A.F.C. players
Colchester United F.C. managers
Wrexham A.F.C. managers
Grimsby Town F.C. managers
Footballers from Edinburgh
Scottish Football League representative players
Scotland under-23 international footballers
Association football midfielders
Stoke City F.C. non-playing staff
Scottish football managers
FA Cup Final players
Scottish Junior Football Association players